Eugenia prasina is a species of plant in the family Myrtaceae. It is endemic to Brazil.

References

Endemic flora of Brazil
prasina
Vulnerable plants
Taxonomy articles created by Polbot